Sylvia D. Trimble Bozeman (née Sylvia Trimble, 1947) is an American mathematician and mathematics educator.

Early life and education
Sylvia Bozeman was born in Camp Hill, Alabama on 1 August 1947. She was the third of five children to Horace T., Sr. and Robbie Jones. Although her father worked with numbers daily in his profession as an insurance agent, it was her mother, a housewife, who first cultivated Bozeman’s love for mathematics. Bozeman attended segregated primary and secondary schools in Camp Hill, and was encouraged by her teachers and parents to continue her education. Her high school mathematics teacher, Mr. Frank Holley, further cultivated her interest. He came back after school and taught trigonometry (a course not offered in the curriculum) to her and a group of committed students.

Bozeman graduated from Edward Bell High School in Camp Hill in 1964 and enrolled for her undergraduate studies in mathematics at Alabama A&M University, during which she also worked on summer projects at NASA and Harvard University. She graduated in 1968 as salutatorian and moved with her husband Robert, also a mathematician, to non-segregated Vanderbilt University, where they both began their graduate studies. She earned a master's degree in 1970, despite not having studied much of the prerequisite coursework that her white classmates had. In 1968 linear algebra was just making its way on to the scene as a regular required course in mathematics curricula. It was offered for the first time when she was a senior at Alabama A&M, but she didn't take it. The Vanderbilt faculty suggested Bozeman take it her first year in graduate school, but when she realized it was an undergraduate course, she refused. "I paid for that decision for the rest of my graduate years. I spent a long time trying to learn linear algebra on my own," she laments.

Doctorate and career
"As my career provides me with many opportunities of professional involvement, it is my commitment to always remain 'connected' with mathematics through teaching and/or other scholarly endeavors, and to continue to promote the development of women in mathematics."—Sylvia Bozeman, 1997

The Bozemans had a son and a daughter while Sylvia taught part-time at Vanderbilt and Tennessee State University and Robert finished his doctoral studies in mathematics. The areas of her research and publications have included operator theory in functional analysis, projects in image processing, and efforts to enhance the success of groups currently underrepresented in mathematics. She earned her PhD with her thesis title : "Representations of Generalized Inverses of Fredholm Operators." Graduating in 1980, Bozeman became only the 23rd or 24th black women math Ph.D. in the U.S.

In 1974, Bozeman took a teaching position at Spelman College, a college for Black women in Atlanta, Georgia; Robert was then teaching at Morehouse College, another historically Black college. For over 35 years she has taught mathematics at America's oldest historically black college for women. Located just west of downtown, Spelman's campus sits adjacent Morehouse College. While there, she worked under Shirley Mathis McBay, Etta Zuber Falconer, and Gladys Glass, mathematicians who were pushing to improve Spelman's science and mathematics programs. She began as an instructor in 1974, became assistant professor in 1980, an associate in 1984, and full professor in 1991.Throughout her years at Spelman, professor Bozeman taught a variety of classes—calculus, abstract algebra, transition to higher math, and even her old nemesis linear algebra. She also enjoyed mentoring students and junior faculty.  In 1976, Bozeman took up graduate studies again at Emory University while continuing to hold a position at Spelman. She earned her doctorate in 1980 from Emory, under the supervision of Luis Kramarz and John Neuberger; her thesis was titled Representations of Generalized Inverses of Fredholm Operators. Moreover, Bozeman served as chair of the Mathematics Department from 1982 to 1993, as adjunct faculty in the Math Department at Atlanta University from 1983 to 1985. In 1993, Bozeman established the Center for the Scientific Applications of Mathematics at Spelman College, and served as director. At Spelman she has also been a Vice Provost.

Bozeman retired from Spelman in 2013, after serving the college for 39 years.

The EDGE program
Sylvia Bozeman was one of the founders of Enhancing Diversity in Graduate Education (EDGE), a transition program for women entering graduate studies in the mathematical sciences. Male faculty tend to be less sensitive to the ways in which women treat their studies, Bozeman says. For example, in class, women might say very little unless they really know what they are talking about. "Women make a B on an exam and they are crushed, they think it's terrible. Men make a B and they think it's great," she says. The EDGE program brings in senior graduates and panelists. The students form study groups and learn how to give and receive information. Critical to graduate school survival, says Bozeman. In 2007 the EDGE Program was given special recognition by the American Mathematical Society for its effectiveness.

Research and recognition
Bozeman's  research has focused on functional analysis and image processing, and has been funded by the Army Research Office, National Science Foundation, and NASA.

Her efforts to encourage women from underrepresented groups to pursue graduate degrees in mathematics were recognized by President Obama when he appointed her to the President’s Committee on the National Medal of Science. Her awards, honors, and recognitions include:
Distinguished Alumni of the Year Award - Al A&M Univ/NAFEO (1996)
Pres. Fac. Award for Dist. Service - Spelman (1995); Distinguished Teaching Award - Southeastern Section of the MAA(1995)
 White House Initiative Faculty Award for Excellence in Science and Technology (1988)
 Tenneco UNCF Award for Excellence in Teaching (1988)
Election to Phi Beta Kappa.
 In 1997 she became Section Governor in the Mathematical Association of America (MAA), the first African-American to reach that level.
 Bozeman was named a Fellow of the American Association for the Advancement of Science in 2009. In 2012, she became a fellow of the American Mathematical Society. In 2017, she was selected as a fellow of the Association for Women in Mathematics in the inaugural class. In 2019 she received the inaugural MAA Award for Inclusivity.
 Bozeman was recognized by Mathematically Gifted & Black as a Black History Month 2017 Honoree.
 She is included in a deck of playing cards featuring notable women mathematicians published by the Association of Women in Mathematics.

References

External links 
 Meet a Mathematician! video interview

1947 births
American women mathematicians
Living people
20th-century American mathematicians
American women academics
Spelman College faculty
African-American mathematicians
Educators from Alabama
Mathematicians from Alabama
20th-century women mathematicians
Fellows of the American Association for the Advancement of Science
Fellows of the American Mathematical Society
Fellows of the Association for Women in Mathematics